This incomplete list of theme park accidents in Disney Parks provides a chronological picture of theme park accidents in the theme parks Disneyland Paris, Walt Disney World Resort, Disneyland Resort, Tokyo Disney Resort, Hong Kong Disneyland Resort and Shanghai Disney Resort over the years. They are organized by the resort areas:

 List of incidents at Disneyland Resort
 List of incidents at Walt Disney World
 List of incidents at Tokyo Disney Resort
 List of incidents at Disneyland Paris
 List of incidents at Hong Kong Disneyland Resort
 List of incidents at Shanghai Disney Resort

See also 
 Amusement park accidents

Disney-related lists
Disney
Walt Disney Parks and Resorts